This is a list of fossiliferous stratigraphic units in South Africa.



See also 

 Lists of fossiliferous stratigraphic units in Africa
 List of fossiliferous stratigraphic units in Botswana
 List of fossiliferous stratigraphic units in Lesotho
 List of fossiliferous stratigraphic units in Madagascar
 List of fossiliferous stratigraphic units in Mozambique
 List of fossiliferous stratigraphic units in Namibia
 List of fossiliferous stratigraphic units in Zimbabwe
 List of fossiliferous stratigraphic units in Antarctica
 Geology of South Africa

References 
 

South Africa
 
 
Fossiliferous stratigraphic units
Fossil